Ernesto Maier (sometimes shown as Ernst Mair, born 1946) was an Italian luger who competed during the late 1960s and the early 1970s. He won the bronze medal in the men's doubles event at the 1967 FIL World Luge Championships in Hammarstrand, Sweden.

Maier also finished eighth in the men's doubles event at the 1972 Winter Olympics in Sapporo.

References

External links
Hickok sports information on World champions in luge and skeleton.
Wallenchinsky, David. (1984). "Luge: Men's Two-seater". In The Complete Book the Olympics: 1896-1980. New York: Penguin Books. p. 576.

Italian male lugers
Lugers at the 1968 Winter Olympics
Lugers at the 1972 Winter Olympics
1946 births
Olympic lugers of Italy
Living people
Sportspeople from Südtirol